Jaime Leopoldo Drew Henriquez (16 September 1876 – 14 April 1948) was an early twentieth-century Puerto Rican educator, civil servant, writer and engineer from Ponce, Puerto Rico.

Early years
Jaime Leopoldo Drew Henriquez was born in Barrio Playa, Ponce, Puerto Rico, on 16 September 1876, the son of Carlos M. Drew, a Dominican, and Matilde Henriquez, a Puerto Rican woman born in Naguabo. He lived in Ponce until age seven, when his family moved to the Dominican Republic. His family moved back to Ponce when Drew was eleven, and a year later, he moved to England where he completed his elementary and high school education.

Education
After completing his high school training, he entered Wesleyan College of the University of London where he graduated with a bachelor's degree in Arts and Civil Engineering, graduating cum laude. He studied in London, England at Oxford University, becoming the first Puerto Rican to graduate from that university.

Career

After completing his Engineering degree, Drew practiced engineering in Puerto Rico and Venezuela. However, he became interested in the teaching profession instead. His first teaching jobs were in economically deprived rural areas of the Puerto Rican country side, including Adjuntas. He subsequently moved to Ponce to teach in schools in Ponce's urban zone. His teaching subjects included physics, English as a second language, French, and Spanish. Drew spent his life teaching at the Ponce High School, starting under its first principal, Chales H. Terry. He spent 15 years teaching at the Ponce High School, and during his spare time he also taught courses at various business schools in Ponce.

For several years, Drew also held positions as school principal, public schools inspector, and advisor to the Languages Department of the Puerto Rico's Departamento de Instruccion Publica (Department of Public Instruction), now Department of Education. Drew wrote several books, including "Liga de Bondad", "English Idiomatic Expressions", "Short Stories", and "Libro de Poemas en Ingles y Espanol".

At age 41, on 18 July 1918, Drew entered the United States Armed Forces during World War I conflict and held the rank of lieutenant teaching various military courses to the incoming military personnel.

Extracurricular activities
In 1905 Drew became a member of the Freemason society in Ponce and, in 1947, he served as head of the Freemason Society in Ponce (Respetable Logia Aurora de Ponce). He was also a Grand Master in the Ponce chapter of the Order of Odd Fellows of America. He also served in the board of directors of Albergue de Niños de Ponce.

Representing the Ponce High School, site of the 25 January 1899 fire, and together with Antonio S. Arias Ventura and Antonio Mirabal, Drew was one of three municipal board members entrusted with erecting the obelisk monument at Plaza Degetau to honor the men who fought the "El Polvorin" fire of 25 January 1899.

Death
A few months before his death, Drew started feeling weak and short of breath. After visiting with Dr. Pila, Drew returned to the classroom for a few months, but started to feel weak again, falling victim to heart disease. He died on 14 April 1948.

Legacy
In northeast Ponce there is a residential sector named after him. In Ponce there is also an elementary school in the Baldorioty community, Barrio Segundo, also named after him. Also in Ponce, he is recognized at the Park for the Illustrious Ponce Citizens. His grave in Ponce at Cementerio Civil de Ponce is oftentimes honored by placing flowers, especially on 7 May, Día del Maestro (Day of the Teacher).

See also

 List of Puerto Ricans

References

1948 deaths
1876 births
Alumni of the University of Oxford
Burials at Cementerio Civil de Ponce
Educators from Ponce
Puerto Rican Freemasons
Puerto Rican Army personnel
Military personnel from Ponce
Puerto Rican military officers